Francis Melling was the speaker of the House of Assembly of Jamaica in 1725.

See also
 List of speakers of the House of Assembly of Jamaica

References 

Year of birth missing
Year of death missing
Speakers of the House of Assembly of Jamaica
17th-century Jamaican people
18th-century Jamaican people